Where Go the Boats is a 1978 album by jazz saxophonist John Handy.

Track listing
All tracks composed by John Handy; except where indicated

Side one
 "Right There, Right There" (John Handy, James Leary)
 "Moogie Woogie" 
 "Where Go the Boats" (Beatrice Scott, Robert Louis Stevenson, Peter W. Dykema)
 "Go for Yourself"

Side two
 "The Hissing of Summer Lawns" (Joni Mitchell, John Guerin)
 "She Just Won't Boogie with Me" (Eddie "Bongo" Brown, John Handy, Abraham Laboriel, Bill King, James Gadson, Lee Ritenour)
 "Erica"
 "Salud to Sonny"

Personnel 
John Handy – alto saxophone
 Bill King - piano
 Steve Erquiaga - guitar
 Lee Ritenour - guitar
 Abraham Laboriel - electric bass
 James Leary - bass
 James Gadson - drums
 Eddie Marshall - drums
 Eddie "Bongo" Brown - conga drums
 Aashish Khan - sarod
 Ian Underwood - synthesizers
 Herman Riley - tenor saxophone
 Nolan Smith - trumpet
 Donald W. Cooke - trombone

References 

1978 albums
Warner Records albums
Jazz-funk albums
John Handy albums
albums produced by Esmond Edwards